The Little River is a  tributary of the Menominee River on the Upper Peninsula of Michigan in the United States.

See also
List of rivers of Michigan

References

Michigan Streamflow Data from the USGS

Rivers of Michigan
Tributaries of Lake Michigan